The Chicago and North Western Railway Depot may refer to one of the following former and active train stations:

 Chicago and Northwestern Railway Depot -- Glencoe, Illinois
 Chicago and North Western Railroad Depot (Norwood Park, Chicago)
 Chicago and Northwestern Depot (Sycamore, Illinois)
 Chicago and Northwestern Depot (Wilmette, Illinois)
 Chicago and North Western Passenger Depot, Wall Lake, Iowa
 Chicago and North Western Railway Passenger Depot, Green Bay, Wisconsin
 Chicago and Northwestern Railroad Depot (Ironwood, Michigan)
 Chicago and Northwestern Railroad Depot (Fond du Lac, Wisconsin)

See also
 Chicago and North Western Railway